Söse is a river of Lower Saxony, Germany.

Geography 
The Söse rises on the plateau of Auf dem Acker in the district of Göttingen in the southwestern part of the Harz Mountains in Germany. From there it flows initially westwards; and is then impounded at a pre-dam and then by the Söse Dam between the Osterode village of Riefensbeek and the town of Osterode itself. In Osterode the river bends northwest, only to swing westwards near Badenhausen and then southwards near Eisdorf just a few kilometres west of the Harz.

Tributaries 
 Große Söse ("Great Söse", left headstream)
 Kleine Söse ("Little Söse", right headstream)
 Große Limpig (right)
 Eipenke (left)
 Ospenke (left)
 Lerbach (right)
 Apenke (left)
 Große Bremke (right)
 Wellbeek (right)
 Uferbach (right)
 Sulpebach (right)
 Markau (right)
 Bierbach (right)
 Dornkesbach (right)
 Goldbach (right)
 Salza (left)
 Dorster Mühlenbach (left)

Walking 
At the confluence of the Great Söse and the Great Morgenbrod is the Morgenbrodt Hut (ca. 600 bis ; ). This spot is no. 148 in the system of checkpoints in the Harzer Wandernadel hiking network. The Morgenbrodt Hut was demolished in 2013 by the National Park Authority as it was falling down and it is not intended to be replaced.

See also 
List of rivers of Lower Saxony

References 

 
Rivers of Lower Saxony
Rivers of the Harz
Rivers of Germany